The 1978 Macdonald Brier, the Canadian men's curling championship was held March 5 to 10, 1978 at the Pacific Coliseum in Vancouver, British Columbia.

Team Alberta, who was skipped by Mike Chernoff won the Brier tankard by finishing the round robin with a 9–2 record. This was Alberta's thirteenth Brier championship overall. Chernoff's rink would go onto represent Canada in the 1978 Air Canada Silver Broom, the men's world curling championship on home soil in Winnipeg, Manitoba where they lost in the semifinal to Norway.

Teams
The teams are listed as follows:

Round Robin standings
Final Round Robin standings

Round Robin results
All draw times are listed in Pacific Standard Time (UTC-08:00).

Draw 1
Sunday, March 5, 2:30 pm

Draw 2
Monday, March 6, 1:00 pm

Draw 3
Monday, March 6, 7:30 pm

Draw 4
Tuesday, March 7, 1:00 pm

Draw 5
Wednesday, March 8, 1:00 pm

Draw 6
Wednesday, March 8, 7:30 pm

Draw 7
Thursday, March 9, 1:00 pm

Draw 8
Thursday, March 9, 7:30 pm

Draw 9
Friday, March 10, 1:00 pm

Draw 10
Friday, March 10, 7:30 pm

Draw 11
Saturday, March 11, 11:45 am

Awards

All-Star Team 
The media selected the following curlers as All-Stars.

Ross G.L. Harstone Award
The Ross Harstone Award was presented to the player chosen by their fellow peers as the curler who best represented Harstone's high ideals of good sportsmanship, observance of the rules, exemplary conduct and curling ability.

References

Rosters - Soudog Curling

Macdonald Brier
1978
Curling in British Columbia
Sport in Vancouver
Macdonald Brier
Macdonald Brier